Sam Fisher may refer to:

 Sam Fisher (Australian footballer) (born 1982), former Australian rules footballer
 Sam Fisher (Scottish footballer) (born 2001), Scottish association footballer
 Sam Fisher (Splinter Cell), protagonist of Ubisoft's Splinter Cell video game series

See also
 Samuel Fisher (disambiguation)
 Sam Fischer (born 1991), Australian singer, songwriter, and musician
 Samantha Fisher (born 1995), Canadian curler